The Castile Formation is a geologic formation in west Texas and southeastern New Mexico. It was deposited in the Ochoan Stage of the Permian period.

Description
The formation is found within the Delaware Basin and was deposited after the formation of the Capitan Formation, the fossil reef defining the margins of the Delaware Basin. The formation lies on the Bell Canyon Formation and in turn is overlain by the Salado Formation, which is characterized in the subsurface by a thick sequence of halite beds. In locations towards the margins of the Delaware Basin, the Salado Formation is composed mostly of anhydrite and gypsum resembling the Castile, and here the contact is placed at a brecciated bed thought to represent an unconformity between the two formations.

The Castile Formation, and the overlying Salado Formation, form an evaporite sequence that formed in a very deep basin (over ) from increasingly saline waters. The presence of fine laminations in the formation, which can be traced over great distances, indicate deposition well below wave base.

History of investigation
The unit was first named by George Burr Richardson in 1904 for exposures in west Texas. The formation was subsequently trace north into the Pecos River valley and is extensive in the subsurface. In 1935, Walter B. Lang removed the upper beds of the unit, which include extensive halite beds in the subsurface, into the Salado Formation.

Footnotes

References
 
 
 
 
 
 

Permian formations of New Mexico
Permian formations of Texas